The 1895 Victorian Football Association season was the 19th season of the Australian rules football competition. The season was opened on 4 May, and concluded on 21 September.  won the premiership by six points, with a record of 12 wins, 5 draws and one loss. It was Fitzroy's first VFA premiership.

Premiership season 
In 1895, the VFA competition consisted of thirteen teams of 20 on-the-field players each. Unless otherwise noted, matches began at 3pm. Because there was an odd number of teams, at least one team had a bye each week; the idle club often travelled to Ballarat to play one of the local senior clubs in a non-premiership match. When reporting match scores in 1895, the number of goals and behinds scored by each team is given; however, only the number of goals scored is considered when determining the result of a match.

Round 1

Round 2

Round 3

Round 4

Round 5

Round 6

Round 7

Round 8

Round 9

Round 10

Round 11

Round 12

Round 13

Round 14

Round 15

Round 16

Round 17

Round 18

Round 19

Round 20

Ladder 

The Association had no formal tie-breakers in cases where clubs were equal on premiership points.

Premiership 
While Fitzroy finished with fewer wins than either Geelong or Melbourne, and also scored 51 goals fewer than Geelong, it lost only one match for the season, and conceded 15 goals fewer than any other team. This was also the first ever premiership in the history of the Fitzroy Football Club.

Fitzroy was unbeaten in its last fourteen matches, coming from behind to claim the premiership from Geelong and Melbourne. Geelong, who had begun the season with a ten-match winning streak, and Melbourne, who had begun the season with an eight-match winning streak, were considered most likely to win the premiership at mid-season, but both teams' form fell off in the second half of the season to finish 13–5.

Fitzroy officially clinched the premiership in Round 19, its last match for the season, with a draw against South Melbourne: this, and Geelong's unusual 0.9 – 1.0 loss to Port Melbourne, ensured that Fitzroy could not be tied or passed for first place.

Leading goalkickers 
The high-scoring Geelong team produced three of the top five goalkickers for the season.

Notable events 
The cricketers were forced to leave the field at 3pm to accommodate the football match. After the Fitzroy Cricket Club lodged an official complaint with the VCA and the VFA, North Melbourne was fined one shilling.
  won its Round 9 match against  by one goal after Langley marked on the final bell, and kicked a goal after the bell from 40 yards.

Non-premiership matches 
Association teams often played exhibition matches separate to the premiership season, particularly during bye weeks. This is not a complete list of all such matches, but is a selection of the most notable such games in 1895.

Charity Saturday 
On the Saturday between Rounds 5 and 6, a charity event was held. Although the league had previously held charity days during the premiership season, this was the first time that the premiership season had been suspended entirely to accommodate the event. Two shortened matches, each lasting approximately one hour and played across two separate periods, were played as part of the event; two pairs of fierce rivals were selected to maximise interest in the matches. The charity event trialled the use of boundary umpires.

Additionally, a 130-yard sprint race, open to any Association players and run without handicap, was held. The race was won by Drew of Port Melbourne; Palmer of  finished second and Morton of  finished third.

Norwood's tour of Victoria 
Norwood, the winners of the 1894 South Australian Football Association (SAFA) premiership, undertook a two-week tour of Victoria in May and June, playing five exhibition matches against Association clubs and a combined Ballarat team.

While Norwood finished with one win and two draws from the five matches, the tour proved to be a financial disaster for the club, as all five matches were poorly attended. With Norwood's share of the gate takings being a mere £30, the club lost £170 on the tour.

Other notable matches 
 On the Saturday prior to Round 1, the defending premiers  played the traditional match against a combined team of juniors at the East Melbourne Cricket Ground. Essendon, fielding twenty players against the juniors' twenty-three, won by the score of 13.15 to 3.3.
 On Sunday, 30 September, premiers  faced a Combined Ballarat team at Saxon Paddock. The Combined Ballarat team won by the score of 7.8 to 5.4.

References 

Victorian Football League seasons
Vfa Season, 1895